Molla molla is a species of skipper butterfly in the family Hesperiidae. It is the only species in the monotypic genus Molla.

References

Natural History Museum Lepidoptera genus database

Hesperiinae
Monotypic butterfly genera
Hesperiidae genera